Eugene Lawrence Roof (born January 13, 1958) is a retired Major League Baseball outfielder. He played during three seasons at the Major League level for the St. Louis Cardinals and Montreal Expos.

Playing career
He was drafted by the Cardinals in the 12th round of the 1976 amateur draft. He is the brother of Phil Roof and cousin of Eddie Haas. His brothers Adrian, Paul, and David Roof played in the minor leagues.

Coaching career
Since his retirement as a player in 1988, Roof has been a part of the Tigers organization as coach.  He served as manager with Fayetteville Generals in 1989, London Tigers in 1991, Toledo Mud Hens from 1997 to 1999, and the Jacksonville Suns in 2000.  He had also served as first base coach under Tigers manager Sparky Anderson from 1992 to 1995. Roof served as the Tigers minor league-wide outfield and base-running coordinator from 2001 until his retirement after the 2020 season.

Personal life
All three of Roof's sons have played professionally. Shawn and Eric were minor leaguers in the Tigers organization, while the youngest, Jonathan, was drafted by the Rangers in 2010. Shawn Roof became a Minor League Baseball manager. Eric Roof became a college baseball coach.

References

External links

Venezuelan Professional Baseball League

1958 births
Living people
American expatriate baseball players in Canada
Arkansas Travelers players
Baseball coaches from Kentucky
Baseball players from Kentucky
Detroit Tigers coaches
Gulf Coast Cardinals players
Indianapolis Indians players
Johnson City Cardinals players
Leones del Caracas players
American expatriate baseball players in Venezuela
Louisville Redbirds players
Major League Baseball outfielders
Minor league baseball managers
Montreal Expos players
Nashville Sounds players
Richmond Braves players
St. Louis Cardinals players
St. Mary High School (Paducah, Kentucky) alumni
St. Petersburg Cardinals players
Sportspeople from Paducah, Kentucky
Springfield Redbirds players
Toledo Mud Hens players
Gastonia Cardinals players